Harry Corry is a Northern Irish home decor store headquartered in Belfast, Northern Ireland.

Harry Corry Interiors is a family-run business which was established by Harry Corry in 1968. The company has more than 50 retail outlets throughout Northern Ireland, the Republic of Ireland and Scotland and employs more than 700 staff. They sell curtains, bedding, curtain poles, lamps and towels.

The company launched an e-commerce site in 2013, as well as building a strong presence across various social media sites.

In 2018 the company sponsored a Best Interior Design Award.

Harry Corry has sponsored the Belfast Giants since 2016, including branding around and on the ice at the SSE Arena, Belfast. They also sponsor four players at the team, Ben Lake, Cianan Long, Colby McAuley and David Gilbert after previously sponsoring Darcy Murphy, Ciaran Long, Ben Lake, and Jordan Boucher during the 2021/2022 season.

In 2022, Harry Corry reported a mediam gender pay gap of -0.4% and a mean of -1.9% in Ireland, meaning that on average a women earns more than a man on average at the business.

External links
 Official site

References

Retail companies of Ireland